James Donald Farrar (5 October 1923 – 26 July 1944) was an English poet.

Biography
Farrar was born on 5 October 1923 in London, the second son of Donald Frederic Farrar (1897–1982), a former Royal Flying Corps supply pilot, and Mabel Margaret Farrar, née Hadgraft (1896–1985). He lived in Carshalton, a small village in Surrey, England. He attended the local grammar school, Sutton Grammar School, before working in London. He was the younger brother of the aeronautical engineer David J. Farrar – references to David appear throughout his published writings – and first cousin of Stewart Farrar.

As Farrar had volunteered for the RAF, he was called up in February, 1942 and received his commission as Pilot Officer the following year, serving as a flight navigator of a de Havilland Mosquito with 68 Squadron. On the night of 25–26 July 1944, Farrar and his pilot Flight Lieutenant Frederick John Kemp, on an anti-diver patrol over the Thames Estuary, attempted to intercept a V-1 flying bomb over the Thames River. The aircraft was destroyed during this action, killing Kemp and Farrar in the process. Farrar's body has not been recovered.

Literary achievements
James Farrar's collection of poetry and prose was published in 1950 in an anthology entitled, "The Unreturning Spring", edited by Henry Williamson. An abridged version, "Spring Returning" edited by Christopher Palmer, was published in 1986.

Seven poems from "The Unreturning Spring" were set to music in 1965 by Trevor Hold as a song cycle for soprano, baritone and chamber orchestra.

His life has also been documented by Alwyn Trubshaw, Farrar's former English teacher from Sutton Grammar School.  Trubshaw has been quoted as saying, "I say taught English, but it would be truer to say I taught English in his presence only. He had no need of my teaching. He was a natural born writer."

More recently, the Autumn of 2008 heralded a resurgence of interest in James Farrar, with a public performance of his writings taking place at The Charles Cryer Theatre, in Surrey; and re-publication of "The Unreturning Spring".

References 
Farrar, J. (1950)The Unreturning Spring, Williams & Norgate Ltd, London.  Re-published Oct 2008 by Friends of Honeywood Museum
Trubshaw, A. James Farrar: An Appreciation
Bennetts, Ben. Portrait of the artist as a young introvert

Notes 

1923 births
1944 deaths
Royal Air Force officers
Royal Air Force personnel killed in World War II
Writers from London
People from Surrey (before 1965)
People educated at Sutton Grammar School
20th-century English poets
English male poets
20th-century English male writers
Victims of aviation accidents or incidents in 1944
Victims of aviation accidents or incidents in England